SAIC Maxus Automotive Co., Ltd. trading as Maxus and sometimes known by the pinyin transcription of its Chinese name, Datong (大通) is a Chinese vehicle brand. Currently, it is a commercial and passenger vehicle manufacturer being a wholly owned subsidiary of SAIC Motor, which owns other brands such as MG and Roewe.

Name
The brand Maxus originates from the LDV Maxus model of the defunct British commercial vehicle manufacturer LDV Group, following the acquisition of LDV's intellectual property by SAIC in 2010.

History
The first Maxus product, the V80 van, was unveiled at the Auto Shanghai motor show in April 2011. In the same month SAIC signed an agreement appointing the Malaysia-based WestStar group as the official distributor of the V80 for the Asia Pacific region. The inauguration ceremony of the V80 was held in Shanghai on 29 June 2011. The sale of Maxus vehicles in Australasia began in 2012, with distribution by the Australia-based WMC Group. In September 2013 it was announced that Maxus vehicles would be sold in Thailand starting in 2014, as part of a deal between SAIC and SAIC Motor-CP Co.

Since April 2013, Kauffman Group-subsidiary Andes Motor is the official distributor of the Maxus brand for Chile. Chile became the first foreign market to sell the T60 pick up truck in July 2017, where it has become a complete success, becoming in just a year the 10th most sold pick up truck in Chile, outpacing all Chinese competitors according to the National Automotive Association of Chile and prompting Andes Motor to expand its Maxus dealership network around the country.

In October 2013, Maxus was introduced to Saudi Arabia via Haji Husein Alireza & Co. Ltd.

Maxus's second production model, the G10 MPV, went on sale in China in March 2014. In the same month, Maxus was introduced to Iran, Syria and the UAE.

Maxus was launched in Indonesia via Gaikindo Indonesia International Auto Show 2015 convention on August 20, 2015. On December 14, 2015, Maxus was launched officially in Hong Kong with the V80 and the G10 being sold in cooperation with the Inchcape Group. The brand was launched in Singapore on December 17, 2015, in conjunction with Cycle & Carriage as the official distributor, which was also the official vehicle sponsor for the  8th ASEAN Para Games 2015 event.

On October 2, 2018, Ayala Corporation announced that AC Motors is the official distributor of Maxus vehicles in the Philippines.

Products

Current 
The current Maxus range comprises the following models:

D Series (SUVs) 
Maxus D60 (2019–present)
Maxus EUNIQ 6 electric D60 (2019–present)
Maxus D90 (2017–present)

G Series (MPVs) 
Maxus G10 MPV (2014–present)
Maxus RG10 RV based on G10 (2019–present)
Maxus EG10 electric G10 (2016–present)
Maxus G20 MPV (2019–present)
Maxus G50 MPV (2018–present)
Maxus EUNIQ 5 electric G50 (2019–present)
Maxus G90 MPV (2022–present)
Maxus Mifa 9 MPV (2021–present)

T Series (Pick-up trucks)
Maxus T60 (2016–present)
Maxus T70 (2019–present)
Maxus T90 (2021–present)

V Series (Vans) 
Maxus EV30 van (2018–present)
Maxus V70 van (2022–present)
Maxus V80 van (2011–present)
Maxus RV80 RV based on V80 (2016–present)
Maxus EV80 electric V80 (2014–present)
Maxus FCV80 extended V80
Maxus SV62 V80 chassis
Maxus V90 van (2019–present)

RVs 
Maxus V100 based RVs (Based on the V90)
Maxus V80 based RVs
Maxus H90 (Based on the Iveco Daily Ousheng)
Maxus T90 pickup based RV

Former 

Maxus Istana
Maxus LD100

Concepts 

Maxus Tarantula SUV (2017)

Gallery

References

Further reading

External links
Official website
LDV-UK website
Web oficial Maxus España

Motor vehicle manufacturers of China
SAIC Motor divisions and subsidiaries
Vans
Minibuses
Vehicle manufacturing companies established in 2011
2011 establishments in China
Chinese brands
Luxury motor vehicle manufacturers